This is a list of British television related events in 1927.

Events

Births

See also
 1927 in British music
 1927 in the United Kingdom
 List of British films of 1927

References